Monticello is an unincorporated community in Guilford County, North Carolina, United States. It is east of Browns Summit and lies east of U.S. Route 29, on North Carolina Highway 150.

Other communities in North Carolina
Another community named Monticello is located in Iredell County at coordinates 354756N 0805606W, and another was located in Washington County at coordinates  35.7657178   -76.7363312  354557N  0764411W, but no longer exists, according to the Geographic Names Information System of the USGS.

References

Unincorporated communities in Guilford County, North Carolina
Unincorporated communities in North Carolina